Uzhavan is a 1993 Indian Tamil-language drama film written and directed by Kathir. The film stars Prabhu and Bhanupriya, with Rambha in a cameo role (in her Tamil debut). A. R. Rahman composed the music. The film was released on 13 November 1993, Diwali day.

Plot 
The story depicts the life of a young farmer who has lived life to his fullest and made others live it too. He faces the facts: he is fat and obnoxiously so. They know him as the fat one; that many a pink girl in half-saris laugh at and would not even dream of having to live with as a wife. His mother, an old and dying woman, wishes to see her son happily wedded before she breathes her last. Finally, things seem to be falling into place, with a beautiful country girl that agrees to marriage but later, tells him of her love for another man. Heartbroken, he agrees to wreck the marriage, post which his mother falls sick and becomes worried about him. His younger brother too gets married. Later when the village president challenges him for a bullock race, he agrees and wins. At that very day, his mother dies in pain. He is ridiculed as the one that killed his own mother with his foolish acts. They cuss him and tell him that he would burn on a pyre of wet twigs. He cries to a local school teacher, who takes pity on him. She tells him of how one ought to look at the heart and not what forms outside it. It is all but physical entities, but it is the heart that beats truly. She wipes his tears and teaches him life.

Cast 
 Prabhu as Sundaram
 Bhanupriya
 Rambha as Eswari (Guest appearance)
 Vignesh
 Senthil
 Chinni Jayanth
 Sujatha as Subbammal, Sundaram's mother

Production 
Uzhavan is the first Tamil film for Rambha.

Soundtrack 
All music composed by A. R. Rahman. The lyrics are by Vaali unless otherwise noted.

References

External links 
 

1990s Tamil-language films
1993 drama films
1993 films
Films directed by Kathir
Films scored by A. R. Rahman
Indian drama films